The Sod House, which is also known as Marshall McCully Sod House, is a sod house built in 1894.  It is located in Alfalfa County, Oklahoma approximately four miles north of Cleo Springs, Oklahoma.

History
The Sod House was built by Marshal McCully in 1894. Sod houses were constructed by settlers of southern and western Oklahoma Territory because there was not enough timber to build wooden houses. The sod house near Cleo Springs is the only remaining sod house in Oklahoma that was built by settlers. It was listed on the National Register of Historic Places in 1970. The Sod House Museum (under the Oklahoma Historical Society) maintains the structure.

See also
List of sod houses

References

External links
 Sod House Museum - Oklahoma Historical Society

Houses on the National Register of Historic Places in Oklahoma
Houses completed in 1894
Sod houses
Oklahoma Historical Society
Museums in Alfalfa County, Oklahoma
Historic house museums in Oklahoma
Houses in Alfalfa County, Oklahoma
National Register of Historic Places in Alfalfa County, Oklahoma